Rhacophorus edentulus (Celebes flying frog) is a species of frog in the family Rhacophoridae endemic to Sulawesi, Indonesia. Its natural habitats are rivers, freshwater marshes, and intermittent freshwater marshes.

References

edentulus
Amphibians of Sulawesi
Endemic fauna of Indonesia
Taxonomy articles created by Polbot
Amphibians described in 1894